Rasm E Duniya is a 2017 Pakistani romantic drama serial which aired on ARY Digital. It was produced by Abdullah Seja. It was a new drama on Idream Entertainment and was directed by Roomi Insha. It starred Armeena Khan and Sami Khan. The drama serial premiered in 2017.

Plot
Two brothers, Harib and Faris, fall in love with the same girl, Haya.  Haya and Faris love each other but Harib has his eyes over Haya and forcibly marries her. The play will also reveal the hidden truth about Musarat & Tabrez who were in love once and the story could not go further, but the agony Musarat holds for her past failure will be avenged and thus the commotion begins.

This mesmerizing drama is a combination of betrayal, rebound connection, love, and paranoid affection that takes a journey to menace.

Cast
Armeena Khan as Haya
Sami Khan as Harib
Bilal Abbas as Faaris
Erum Azam as Haya
Javed Sheikh as Tabraiz
Samina Peerzada as Musarrat
Nida Mumtaz as Bushra
Diya Mughal as Shaazia
Dania Anwar
Saba Bukhari
Ehtesham Ali

Soundtrack
Rasm e duniya Ost sung by Azmat ali. Amika Shael.

See also 
 List of programs broadcast by ARY Digital
 2017 in Pakistani television

References

Pakistani drama television series
2017 Pakistani television series debuts
ARY Digital original programming
Urdu-language television shows